Sobral is a municipality in the state of Ceará, Brazil.

Sobral is the fifth largest municipality of Ceará, after Fortaleza. Its economy is based on agriculture, services and some manufacturing industries. The city has two public universities: Universidade Federal do Ceará) and Universidade Estadual do Vale do Acaraú. The city is the seat of the Roman Catholic Diocese of Sobral.

The city is known for being the place where the astronomical observation of a solar eclipse on May 29, 1919, by a team of British scientists led by Sir Frank Watson Dyson was offered as the first proof of Albert Einstein's theory of general relativity, which had been published in 1916. The town's  ("Museum of the Eclipse") celebrates this event. There is a monument in Patrocínio Square marking the location of this solar eclipse. A planetarium was also inaugurated in 2015 next to this monument.

Government
 Ivo Gomes (PDT)

Geography

Climate
The climate of Sobral is hot almost all year. The temperature in the municipality varies from 22 to 36 °C (72 to 97 °F).

Education

Universities
 Universidade Vale do Acaraú (Acaraú Valley University)
 Universidade Federal do Ceará (Federal University of Ceará)

There are 105 schools in the city.

Public schools
 Escola Municipal de Ensino Fundamental Sinhá Saboia
 Escola Estadual Dom José Tupinambá da Frota
 Escola Municipal Emílio Sendim
 Escola Municipal Maria do Carmo de Andrade
 Escola Municipal Mocinha Rodrigues
 Escola Padre Osvaldo Chaves
 Escola Prof Gerardo Rodrigues de Albuquerque
 colégio sobralense de tempo integral maria dias ibiapína

Private schools
 Escola Sant´Ana
 Escola Luciano Feijão
 Escola Farias Brito Sobralense
 Escola José Romão
 Escola do Patrocinio
 Escola São Francisco de Assis
 colégio maria imaculada

Media

Radio
The city has thirteen radio stations.
 Jovem Pan FM
 Rede Jangadeiro
 Rede Som Zoom Sat
 Rede Plus FM
 Coqueiros FM
 Paraíso FM
 Public Radio
 Sobral Public Radio
 Caiçara AM
 Tupinambá AM
 Regional
 Ressureição
 Educadora do Nordeste de Sobral

Television
The city has one television station, NordesTV.

Tourist attractions
 Museu do Eclipse  (Museum)
 Museu Dom José (Museum)
 Museu MADI (Museum)
 Teatro São José (Theatre)
 Teatro São João (Theatre)
 Biblioteca Pública Municipal (Library)

Access
Four roads give access to the city: BR-222, CE-441 and BR-220.

The city is served by Cel. Virgílio Távora Airport.

Notable people
 Ciro Gomes, former governor and mayor of Fortaleza, former finance minister (Originally from Pindamonhangaba, São Paulo)
 Florent Amodio, figure skater
 Maria Tomásia Figueira Lima (1826-1902), aristocrat, abolitionist
 Cid Gomes, former governor
 Patrícia Saboya, former senator
 Antônio Renato Aragão, comic actor, film producer, and writer
 Belchior, singer

References

External links
 

Municipalities in Ceará
Populated places established in 1772